Wayne Calloway (September 12, 1935 - July 8, 1998) was an important North American golf course architect who designed many courses in Canada and the United States. was chairman and CEO of PepsiCo from 1986 until the mid-1990s. He was chairman of the board of Wake Forest University. They named their undergraduate school of business in his honor in 1995. He died July 8, 1998 from cancer.  As of 2007, the Calloway Business School is ranked 17th in the nation for undergraduate business schools by U.S. News & World Report.

References

External links 
 

1998 deaths
Wake Forest University people
1935 births
American chief executives of food industry companies
20th-century American businesspeople
Deaths from cancer in the United States
Snack food manufacturers of the United States